Robert John Steckle (August 21, 1930 – September 25, 2022) was a Greco-Roman and freestyle wrestler from Canada who competed in three consecutive summer Olympic Games, starting in 1952. He carried the Canadian flag at the opening ceremonies of the 1956 Summer Olympic Games in Melbourne, Australia, the only Canadian wrestler ever to do so. He was born in Kitchener, Ontario.

Steckle won silver at the 1954 British Empire and Commonwealth Games (light heavyweight 87 kg) and bronze at the 1958 Empire Commonwealth Games (light heavyweight 87 kg). He took silver at the 1963 Pan-American Games (87 kg).

Steckle was the 1955 and 1957 AAU Greco-Roman National Champion (191 lbs), as well as the Canadian Freestyle champion in 1951, 1952, 1954, 1956, 1957, 1959, 1960, 1962, and 1963, and Greco-Roman champion in 1952, 1956, and 1960. He was inducted as an Athlete into the Canadian Wrestling Hall of Fame in 1983, and into the University of Guelph Gryphon Hall of Fame in 1984 for his contributions to Gryphon football as the 1951 Wildman Trophy recipient in addition to his accomplishments in wrestling.

References

1930 births
2022 deaths
Canadian male sport wrestlers
Wrestlers at the 1952 Summer Olympics
Wrestlers at the 1956 Summer Olympics
Wrestlers at the 1960 Summer Olympics
Olympic wrestlers of Canada
Wrestlers at the 1954 British Empire and Commonwealth Games
Wrestlers at the 1958 British Empire and Commonwealth Games
Commonwealth Games silver medallists for Canada
Commonwealth Games bronze medallists for Canada
Pan American Games silver medalists for Canada
Sportspeople from Kitchener, Ontario
Commonwealth Games medallists in wrestling
Pan American Games medalists in wrestling
Players of Canadian football from Ontario
Guelph Gryphons football players
Wrestlers at the 1963 Pan American Games
Medalists at the 1963 Pan American Games
Medallists at the 1954 British Empire and Commonwealth Games
Medallists at the 1958 British Empire and Commonwealth Games